The Oregonian Printing Press Park, or simply Printing Press Park, is a triangular 1,000-square-foot park on the southeastern corner of the intersection of Southwest First Avenue and Morrison Street in Portland, Oregon, United States. The green space marks where editor Thomas J. Dryer operated a small press to publish Portland's weekly newspaper, which would become The Oregonian, beginning on December 4, 1850.

See also
 List of parks in Portland, Oregon

References

External links

 

Parks in Portland, Oregon
Southwest Portland, Oregon